Matt Schultz is an American attorney and politician.

Matt Schultz or Matthew Schultz may also refer to:

Matthew Schultz, musician
Matt Schultz (rugby league), player in 1996 Leeds RLFC season

See also
 Matt Schulz, American drummer
 Matt Schulze (born 1972), American actor
 Matt Shultz, lead singer for Cage the Elephant
 Matthew Schulz, student of Benjamin Drake Wright